Max Sherman (died February 28, 2010) was a businessperson and politician in Brantford, Ontario, Canada. He was the city's mayor for two years and served a total of thirty-one years on the Brantford City Council.

Early life and private career

Max Sherman was born in Toronto, the son of Ben Sherman, who owned and operated Sherman's Hardware for many years. The younger Sherman planned to open his own hardware store in the city, but was diagnosed with tuberculosis only three days before the store's scheduled launch in 1938. As a result, he spent ten months recovering at the Brantford Sanatorium. He later recounted that his doctor told him, "You can open your business in three days and die or go to the San, get cured and have a chance at a long, healthy life." Reflecting on the situation at age eighty-nine, he said that moving to Brantford was the right choice.

He was active in Brantford's Jewish community, serving as master of ceremonies at the opening of a new synagogue building in 1948 and chairing B'nai Brith Canada's Brantford lodge (which closed in 1974). He was refused admission into the Brantford chapter of an international service organization in the 1950s because of anti-Semitism, though he chose not to publicize the matter at the time. Many years later, he said that popular opinions had changed significantly in his lifetime and described Brantford as "a good town to live in."

Political career

Sherman later started a hardware store in Brantford and became involved in the city's political life. He first served on city council from 1953 to 1957, when he began a two-year term as mayor. He sought election to the Legislative Assembly of Ontario in the 1959 provincial election, but was defeated. He served further terms on city council from 1961 to 1964 and from 1976 to 1997. During his last twenty-one years on council, he represented the city's third ward.

As mayor, Sherman led council in purchasing the land on which Brantford City Hall now sits. He also helped bring about the Brantford Civic Centre and oversaw the start of construction for the city's sewage treatment plant. The later measure was undertaken, in large part, to improve the environmental condition of the Grand River.

Sherman helped negotiate the 1980 Brant-Brantford Annexation Agreement, which saw the county shift a piece of its territory to the city. He later said that he regarded the agreement as a success story and criticized popular perceptions that it took place amid acrimony and threats of retribution. Sherman also chaired the Brant County social services committee in the 1980s; in 1985, he criticized county politicians for attempting to cut off most social assistance recipients.

Sherman was a respected public figure during his later years, serving on several boards including the Brantford Waste Reduction Steering Committee, the Brantford Community Services Advisory Board, and the Victorian Order of Nurses Brant-Haldimand-Norfolk Branch. Max Sherman Drive, the foyer at city hall, and the auditorium at the Brantford Seniors' Centre are all named in his honour. He supported Mike Hancock's successful mayoral campaigns in 2003 and 2006.

He died in 2010 at age ninety-five.

Electoral record
Municipal (partial)

Provincial

References

2010 deaths
Mayors of Brantford
Year of birth missing
Progressive Conservative Party of Ontario candidates in Ontario provincial elections